Steinhausen may refer to :

Places
Steinhausen an der Rottum, Baden-Württemberg, Germany
Steinhausen, Namibia, district capital of Okorukambe Constituency, Namibia
Steinhausen, Switzerland, Canton Zug, Switzerland
Steinhausen railway station

People
Günther Steinhausen (1917-1942), German World War II Luftwaffe Flying ace
Rolf Steinhausen (born 1943), German motorcycle racer